Analytical Methods is a monthly peer-reviewed scientific journal covering research on the development of analytical techniques. It is published  by the Royal Society of Chemistry and the editor-in-chief is Scott Martin (Saint Louis University).

Abstracting and indexing
The journal is abstracted and indexed in Chemical Abstracts Service, Science Citation Index, and Scopus. According to the Journal Citation Reports, the journal has a 2017 impact factor of 2.073.

References

External links 

Analytical Methods Blog

Chemistry journals
Royal Society of Chemistry academic journals
Publications established in 2009
English-language journals
Hybrid open access journals
Monthly journals